Corfton is a small village in Shropshire, England, located  east of Craven Arms and  north of Ludlow, the two nearest towns.

There is a pub, with its own small brewery (the Corvedale Brewery), called The Sun Inn.

It is named after the nearby River Corve.

The Corvedale Three Castles Walk runs through the village.

History
Corfton was recorded in the Domesday Book of 1086; at the time it formed part of the Saxon hundred of Culvestan (which was replaced in the reign of Henry I by Munslow).

See also
Listed buildings in Diddlebury

References

External links

Villages in Shropshire